Palaeocuma hessi is an extinct species of cumacean, the only species in the genus Palaeocuma, and one of very few fossil cumaceans ever discovered. It lived in the Callovian age (Middle Jurassic) in France.

References

Cumacea
Jurassic crustaceans
Monotypic arthropod genera
Fossils of France